Orphniospora is a genus of lichenized fungi within the Fuscideaceae family.

Species
Species within this genus include:
 Orphniospora groenlandica Körb. 1874 
 Orphniospora moriopsis (A. Massal.) D. Hawksw. 1982 
 Orphniospora moriopsoides (Vain.) Vitik., Ahti, Kuusinen, Lommi & T. Ulvinen 1997 
 Orphniospora mosigii (Körb.) Hertel & Rambold 1988

References

 Wiesław Fałtynowicz: The Lichenes, Lichenicolous and allied Fungi of Poland. Krytyczna lista porostów i grzybów naporostowych Polski. Kraków: Instytut Botaniki im. W. Szafera PAN, 2003. .

External links
Orphniospora at Index Fungorum

Lecanoromycetes genera
Lichen genera
Taxa named by Gustav Wilhelm Körber
Umbilicariales